Robert McLaughlin may refer to:
 
 Bobby McLaughlin (1925–2003), Northern Irish footballer who played for Wrexham, Cardiff City and Southampton,
 Robert McLaughlin (industrialist) (1836–1921), Canadian industrialist and businessman
 Robert McLaughlin (RAF officer) (1896–?), British World War I flying ace
 Robert E. McLaughlin (1908–1973), American journalist and author
 Rob McLaughlin, Canadian journalist and digital media producer